Kid Amazo is a fictional cyborg from DC Comics, built to be the "son" of Amazo. Originally meant to star in a 2004 hardcover called JLA: Kid Amazo, he made his debut three years later, in the pages of JLA Classified; as a result, he was "predated" by the similar Marvel Comics character Victor Mancha, the son of Ultron. His civilian identity is Frank Halloran.

Fictional character biography
Kid Amazo, like his "father" before him, was built by mad scientist Professor Ivo, who was still pursuing his dream of vengeance against the Justice League of America. As Amazo was merely an advanced robot that failed, the next approach would be to cross bio-mechanical material from Amazo's body with human ova and DNA, in order to obtain a cyborg being who would exhibit the best traits of both human and artificial life. To advance his plans and complete Kid Amazo's instruction and programming, Professor Ivo sends him away to live with humanity. The young cyborg is given the human identity of Frank Halloran, a 21-year-old college student, student of existentialism and follower of Nietzsche's Übermensch concept. Frank forms a close relationship with Sara Shapiro, who, unbeknownst to him, is his "mother" (or at least the donor of the human ova needed for his creation). Sara is the daughter of Professor Ivo, who assigned her to be the young cyborg's handler. As Frank is ignorant of his true past, he merely sees Sara as a confidant and believes he cannot pursue a relationship with her because her Jewish parents would disapprove of Frank's atheism.

Upon witnessing a battle between Amazo and the Leaguers, young Frank Halloran is forced to reconsider his assumptions when Amazo saves Sara's life. He becomes increasingly fascinated by superheroes and their ideals, where Sara responds only with cold detachment. Frank, still shaken up, is later confronted by Amazo itself. Amazo reveals to Frank the truth about his  nature, and Frank convinces himself to join Amazo, whereupon he assumes the alias "Kid Amazo".

Eventually, Kid Amazo has a change of heart and decides to fight on the side of the angels, leaving Professor Ivo to wonder which will be stronger — Frank's human upbringing or his mechanical origins. Frank's every attempt to be a hero backfires horribly, and when Amazo unleashes a Big One earthquake in Berkeley, the "Kid" is forced to stop him. However, his attempts to help are misunderstood and when the authorities pursue him, he is forced to wound a policeman to escape.

Alone, Frank tries to hone his newfound abilities. The Martian Manhunter performs a psychological evaluation on Frank and judges the boy to be on the brink of insanity. The Justice League decides to closely monitor Frank's further attempts to better himself by exploring both sides of his heritage. He fights minor villainy as "The Kid", but winds up the target of Amazo, the League, and Sara herself. This, added to his inability to cope with his isolation and loneliness, leads him to explore his villainous side, which again brings him to the attention of the Justice League.

His life in shambles and his sanity shattered by the revelations about his past, Kid Amazo embraces his full power. Able to mimic both powers and minds, he truly becomes a one-man Justice League. However, his power becomes his downfall, as Batman and the rest of the Leaguers decide to voluntarily bicker and quarrel among themselves, destabilizing both their team and Kid Amazo's mind. The stress of a single mind mimicking a shattered team is enough to make Kid Amazo explode. In the end, Sara is left to mourn her son/lover, and the League is left to deal with the real rancor unearthed by their phony quarrel.

Rebirth
A new Kid-Amazo appeared in the DC Rebirth series, Super-Sons, created by Peter J. Tomasi and Jorge Jimenez. 

Reggie Meyer was a relative of a family both cured and empowered by "The Amazo Virus". They went about their day to day lives protecting their small hometown in Providence, Rhode Island as its own superhero team. Reggie however was more inclined to being a bully than he ever was a good Samaritan, and his particular household was prone to infighting even before they all got a hold of superpowers.

His rotten character only grew worse when an inert program of the original android's technology in Lex Luthor's laboratory's beckoned to him, and showed him the location of the Amazo Armor which would greatly enhance his powers. After procuring the armor he then kidnapped and imprisoned his family in an abandoned warehouse on the outskirts of town. He kept them sequestered there while making bio-android replicas of them that served him. Acting out on his personal familial hate fantasy he would kill them over and over for weeks on end. His younger sister, being a technopath, however, managed to assert her will over Reggie's Sara duplicate and flee the staging facility. When the Super Sons chanced upon his android sibling Kid Amazo sent mechanized doppelgangers, first of Superman and Batman, and then robotic Superboy/Robin replicas against them in order to retrieve his sister. Having captured the duo, the original Kid Amazo presented himself to them. 

He then went into a diatribe about how he planned to strike down the Justice League and create replicas of them to feed his army of Amazo Exoskeletons. But first he would contemplate eliminating his so-called family instead of simply murdering their replacements beforehand. At the last second Lex Luthor, having picked up the distress signal Damian pinged to him before detainment, arrived, and a fight broke out as he and Superboy escaped with Reggie's comatose family. 

While distracted by Superlex his other two adversaries would return to face him down in a final confrontation, in an attempt to re-absorb all the skills and powers of his Replicants to add to his power. However, Robin had Sara painfully remove the sentient Amazo armor from him, ending the threat he posed for a time. 

Somehow Reggie got hold of the Amazo Armor again and attended a Black Bacchanal, a shindig and black market weapons sale for super-villains. It was headed by the crime boss and arms trader Tiger Shark, as well as being attended by a host of dangerous criminal syndicates, superpowered crooks and ne'er-do-well's as well as most every form or tier of malcontent from every major city world wide. He admitted he only attended so he could create more clones to stockpile on superpowers and special skills from all the bad guys who attended, only to be blasted away by Nightwing using Magog's lance.

Powers and abilities
Due to his Amazo "heritage", Kid Amazo has the abilities of the first League core members, but has only displayed super strength, speed, invulnerability, flight, heat  and x-ray vision, and an accelerated healing factor. His main and most advanced power is being able to mimic the mind and personality of the core members of the Justice League, gaining an intimate knowledge of the relationship between the Leaguers and being able to predict the outcome of their teamwork. He possesses the absorption cells of his predecessor.

Rebirth Kid Amazo has the following:

Bio-fission: Reggie can duplicate himself into a finite number of replica's who all share a hive mind, enabling them to compile and ascertain any information through received experience.
Collective strength: Both he and his clones gain multiplied strength dependent on their dupe numbers.
Collective intelligence: Kid Amazo would cleave his own mind, imparting some of it onto his carbon copy's. This retroactively augmented their group IQ giving them a shared genius mind.

After stealing parts of technology from the original android and splicing them together, Reggie managed to repurpose it constructing the Amazo Armor. The suit directly interfaces with the virus in his blood greatly amplifying his infection given abilities.

Nemesis cloning: While adorning the armor, Reggie can create biomechanical android duplicates of anyone whom he sets his power on. All of their skills, abilities, persona and special powers can be emulated through this unique process.
Duplicate Siphon: Kid Amazo can reabsorb his mimesis body doubles in order to acquire their powers or skills. Depending on the number of clones he's made for his army, he can multiply the effective strength of any natural skills they possess.

References 

 Diamond Previews catalogue volume XVI, #6 (June 2004).

External links
 Brady, Matt. "JLA & The Kid: Peter Milligan on Kid Amazo", Newsarama (Feb. 10, 2004)
 Brady, Matt. "Kid Amazo Postponed", Newsarama (Mar. 16, 2004)
 Solicitation for the never-published JLA: Kid Amazo, "DC Feature Articles - April 2004:" Toon Zone (Apr. 2004)

2007 comics debuts
DC Comics robots
Robot supervillains
DC Comics supervillains 
DC Comics characters with accelerated healing
DC Comics characters with superhuman senses
DC Comics characters with superhuman strength 
DC Comics characters who are shapeshifters
DC Comics characters who can move at superhuman speeds
DC Comics characters who have mental powers
DC Comics telekinetics 
DC Comics telepaths
Comics characters introduced in 2016
Fictional characters from Rhode Island 
Fictional characters with X-ray vision
Fictional characters with nuclear or radiation abilities
Fictional characters with air or wind abilities
Fictional characters with ice or cold abilities
Fictional characters with absorption or parasitic abilities
Fictional characters with energy-manipulation abilities
Fictional characters with fire or heat abilities 
Fictional characters who can turn intangible
Fictional characters who can turn invisible
Fictional characters who can stretch themselves
Fictional characters with density control abilities 
Fictional characters who can manipulate light 
Fictional characters who can manipulate sound
Fictional characters who can duplicate themselves  
Characters created by Peter Tomasi
Characters created by Peter Milligan